The Comisión Investigadora de Accidentes de Aviación (CIAA) is the aviation accident investigation authority of the Dominican Republic. Its headquarters are located in Gazcue, Santo Domingo. Article 267 of the Law 491-06 de Civil Aviation of the Dominican Republic created the CIAA.

References

External links

 Comisión Investigadora de Accidentes de Aviación 
 "Programa universal OACI de auditoría de la vigilancia de la seguridad operacional INFORME FINAL DE AUDITORÍA DE LA VIGILANCIA DE LA SEGURIDAD OPERACIONAL DEL SISTEMA DE AVIACIÓN CIVIL DE REPÚBLICA DOMINICANA." (Archive) - International Civil Aviation Organization. January 13–22, 2009 

Aviation organizations based in the Dominican Republic
Government of the Dominican Republic
Dominican Republic